The Basilica of Our Lady of Peace is a Catholic minor basilica dedicated to Our Lady of Peace in Yamoussoukro, the administrative capital of Côte d'Ivoire (Ivory Coast). Guinness World Records lists it as the largest church in the world, having surpassed the previous record holder, Saint Peter's Basilica, upon completion. However, it also includes a rectory and a villa (counted in the overall area), which are not strictly part of the church. It can accommodate 18,000 worshippers, compared to 60,000 for St. Peter's. Ordinary liturgies conducted at the basilica are usually attended by only a few hundred people. The basilica is administered by Polish Pallottines at a cost of US$1.5 million annually. 

The basilica was constructed between 1985 and 1989 with different cost estimates given by various groups. Some stated that it cost US$175 million, US$300 million, or as high as US$600 million. The designs of the dome and encircled plaza are clearly inspired by the Basilica of Saint Peter in Vatican City, although it is not an outright replica. The cornerstone was laid on 10 August 1985, and it was consecrated on 10 September 1990 by Pope John Paul II, who had just formally accepted the basilica as a gift from Félix Houphouët-Boigny on behalf of the Catholic Church. 

The basilica is not to be confused with a cathedral.

Architecture 

While designing it after the Vatican Basilica, Lebanese architect Pierre Fakhoury constructed the dome to be slightly lower than the Basilica of Saint Peter, but ornamented with a larger cross on top. The dome is more than twice the diameter of St. Peter's in Rome, 90 metres versus 41 metres (300 ft versus 136 ft). The base of the dome is much lower than Saint Peter's, so the overall height is slightly less.

Columns are plentiful throughout the basilica but are not uniform in style; the smaller columns are there for structural reasons, while the bigger ones are decorative and contain elevators, rainwater evacuation from the roof and other building mechanical devices. There is enough space to seat 7,000 people in the nave, with standing room for an additional 11,000 people. Apart from the basilica are two identical villas. One of the villas accommodates the clergymen who operate the basilica. A room in the other villa is reserved for papal visits, of which only one has occurred, when the basilica was consecrated.

The wood chosen for the 7,000 pews in the Our Lady of Peace Basilica is iroko wood.

Construction 
The Basilica was built by Dumez, a French construction company.

The cost of the basilica was met with some controversy globally when construction began, especially as the Côte d'Ivoire was going through an economic and fiscal crisis at the time. Pope John Paul II agreed to consecrate the basilica on the condition that a hospital also be built nearby. This hospital, whose construction was frozen during the politico-military crisis from 2002 to 2011, was finally completed in 2014 and opened in January 2015, at a cost of €21.3 million.

Memorial 

Côte d'Ivoire President Houphouët-Boigny chose his birthplace of Yamoussoukro to be the site of the new capital city of his country in 1983. As part of the plan of the city, the president wanted to memorialize himself with the construction of the basilica. He is even pictured beside Jesus ascending to heaven in one stained-glass panel. Due to the location of the Basilica, it was dubbed by the media as "basilica in the bush". Houphouët-Boigny believed it would become a pilgrimage site for African Catholics.

See also 
 List of largest church buildings
 List of tallest church buildings
 List of tallest domes

Notes

Further reading

External links 

 Basilica of Our Lady of Peace photos 2008 – an album of the Basilique images. Outside and inside views.
 

Churches in Ivory Coast
Roman Catholic churches in Ivory Coast
Our Lady of Peace
Roman Catholic churches completed in 1989
Buildings and structures in Yamoussoukro
Pallottines
1990 establishments in Ivory Coast
Church buildings with domes
20th-century Roman Catholic church buildings